The West Coast Game Park Safari is a walk-through safari park in Bandon, Oregon, United States. It opened in 1968, and includes snow leopards, African lions, Bengal tigers, emu, capybara, and cougars.

The park is a petting zoo and captive breeding program, including endangered species such as the snow leopard. They sell and loan big cats to other parks and zoos. 

West Coast Game Park Safari is not AZA Accredited. They are a roadside zoo which lets the public interact with big cats, similar to those featured on the Tiger King series. They had multiple USDA violations in 2015 & 2016, including 4 critical violations in their June 22, 2016 inspection report. The critical violations included mishandling adult & baby animals, as well as shooting 2 of their own bears. In 2020 they were listed on PETA's Highway Hellholes: Roadside Zoos on the Blacklist.

In 1985, Bob Tenney, the park owner, stated the game park received 60,000 visitors per year.

Two American black bears from the game park were bought in 2001 and 2002 by Baylor University, whose mascot is the Baylor Bears.

On May 18, 2021, West Coast Game Park Safari was featured in the Showcase on The Price Is Right.

See also
Wildlife Safari, an animal attraction in Winston, Oregon

References

External links
West Coast Game Park Safari (official website)

Zoos in Oregon
Parks in Coos County, Oregon
Tourist attractions in Coos County, Oregon
1968 establishments in Oregon
Zoos established in 1968